Friends and Nervous Breakdowns is the first/debut album by rapper Weerd Science (real name Josh Eppard) also the former drummer of progressive rock bands 3 and current drummer of Coheed and Cambria. A video was released for "Conspiracy Theories w/ out Mel Gibson".

Track listing
 "Intro" – 1:55
 "Conspiracy Theories w/ out Mel Gibson" – 3:40
 "My War, Your Problem" – 3:34
 "Ordinary Joe (WCH)" – 4:41
 "Girl, Your Baby's Worm Food" – 4:29
 "Blueprint" – 5:44
 "In a City With No Name" – 4:44
 "God Bless Pepsi" – 3:38
 "Fuck You & Your Filthy A&R Dept." – 3:42
 "Joshua, They're Laughing at You" – 3:23
 "Super Friends" – 5:23
 "How to Be a Terrorist" – 4:41
 "The Sitcom Really Really Isn't All That Real" – 4:26
 "Methods n Test Tubes" – 4:21
 "Kill Your Rapper" – 1:41

All songs by Weerd Science.

Personnel
Josh Eppard – Vocals
Michael Birnbaum – Recording, engineering, mixing, guitar on Girl, Your Baby's Worm Food
Chris Bittner – Recording, engineering, mixing, production, bass tracks on My War, Your Problem, Ordinary Joe (WCH), In A City With No Name, Joshua, They're Laughing At You, How To Be A..., and This Sitcom Really Really Isn't All That Real, and music for Ordinary Joe (WCH)
Danny Illchuck – Recording, engineering, production, all scratches, guest vocals on Super Friends
Dave Parker – Recording, engineering, production
Kwame "Gangstophagus" Wiafe-Atenken – spoken word on My War, Your Problem and Fuck You And Your Filthy A&R Dept.
Michael Fossenkemper – Mastering
Bill Scoville – Layout and design

External links
Official Site

2005 albums
Weerd Science albums